Home Again, Home Again is the sixth release by folk rock band Hem. The EP was released on June 26, 2007. A song from the EP, "The Part Where You Let Go," was featured in a 2007 Liberty Mutual commercial.

Track listing
"The Part Where You Let Go"                  (3:44)
"Half Asleep"                                (2:19)
"While My Hand Was Letting Go"               (3:36)
"The Meeting Place"                          (1:12)
"Home Again"                                 (4:18)
"Half Acre"                                  (3:22)

Hem (band) albums
2007 EPs